The Yankie Bar is a caramel, nougat, and milk chocolate bar produced and sold in Denmark by Toms International.

History
Just after the Second World War, Danish candy producer Toms were contacted by the United States high command in Germany, which commissioned Toms to produce a candy bar for the American troops in Germany to avoid transporting such products across the Atlantic. In return, the U.S. would supply Toms with the required amount of cocoa beans.

The Yankie Bar is similar to the European version of the Mars Bar, and both the American troops and the Danish youth found it very tasty. Ten years later, in 1956, Toms launched the Holly Bar, similar to the Yankie bar, but with white nougat and roasted hazelnuts.

References

External links
 Toms Group's homepage
 Yankie Bar on Facebook

Chocolate bars
Danish confectionery
Brand name chocolate
Danish brands
Products introduced in 1946